The Clark County Commission is the governmental organization that governs and runs Clark County, Nevada, providing services to the unincorporated areas. Its offices are located at the Clark County Government Center in Downtown Las Vegas. The commission is considered by many to be the most powerful governmental body in the state of Nevada.

Composition

Districts and terms
Each Commissioner is elected to a four-year term and represents one of seven districts, designated A-G.

Members as of 2021

Ex officio boards
The Clark County Commissioners as a group sit on the following boards:

 Big Bend Water District (Laughlin)
 Clark County Department of Aviation (Paradise)
 Clark County Liquor and Gaming Board (Downtown Las Vegas)
 Clark County Regional Flood Control District (Whitney)
 Clark County Sanitation District (Las Vegas)
 Clark County Water Reclamation District (Whitney)
 Kyle Canyon Water District (Las Vegas)
 Las Vegas Convention and Visitors Authority (Winchester)
 Las Vegas Stadium Authority (Spring Valley)
 Las Vegas Valley Water District (Las Vegas)
 RTC of Southern Nevada (Downtown Las Vegas)
 Southern Nevada Health District (Las Vegas)
 Southern Nevada Regional Housing Authority (Downtown Las Vegas)
 Southern Nevada Water Authority (Downtown Las Vegas)
 University Medical Center of Southern Nevada (Las Vegas)

2002 corruption scandal
On May 5, 2006, 4 out of 7 members (Dario Herrera, Erin Kenny, Mary Kincaid-Chauncey and Lance Malone) were convicted of conspiracy and multiple counts of wire fraud and extortion under color of official right for depriving the Clark County Commission and the citizens of Clark County of their right to the honest services of public officials. They were sentenced to federal prison terms.

References

External links
 Clark County Commission

1909 establishments in Nevada
Government agencies established in 1909
Government buildings completed in 1909
Government of Clark County, Nevada
County governing bodies in the United States